Abdulkhan Bandi is a historic dam located near the village Eski Oqchob, 65 km east of the city Nurota in Uzbekistan. It impounds the river Beklarsoy and was built in the 1580s by Abdullah Khan II, ruler of Bukhara. The dam is an important milestone for Central Asian hydroengineering, and has been added to the UNESCO World Heritage Tentative List on January 18, 2008, in the Cultural category.

References 

 

Dams in Uzbekistan
World Heritage Tentative List